Khorasanlu (also Romanized as Khorāsānlū; also known as Khorāsānak) is a village in Aliabad Rural District, in the Central District of Hashtrud County, East Azerbaijan Province, Iran. At the 2006 census, its population was 352, in 88 families.

References 

Towns and villages in Hashtrud County